TC10 may refer to:
DECtape, a magnetic tape data storage medium
TC10 protein